Jining Grey is a goat breed from the Shandong Province of China, used for the production of its kid pelt and cashmere fiber.

See also
Cashmere goat

Sources
Jining Grey Goat

Goat breeds
Fiber-producing goat breeds
Goatskin-producing goat breeds
Goat breeds originating in China